RQ-00202730 is a benzimidazole derived drug that acts as a potent and highly selective agonist for the CB2 cannabinoid receptor, with a Ki value of 19nM at CB2 and more than 4000x selectivity over CB1, though it also shows some activity as an antagonist of the unrelated 5-HT2B serotonin receptor. It has analgesic and antiinflammatory effects in animal studies, and was developed for the treatment of irritable bowel syndrome, but was ultimately discontinued from development following disappointing results in Phase II clinical trials.

See also 
 AZ-11713908
 AZD-1940
 JTE 7-31
 MCHB-1

References 

Benzimidazoles
Cannabinoids